Alabama's 3rd Senate district is one of 35 districts that elect Senators to the Alabama Senate. The district has been represented by Arthur Orr since 2006.

Geography
The district comprises in whole or in part of Limestone, Madison, and Morgan counties, and had the same composition when the districts were redrawn in 2002.

Recent elections

2018

General election

2014

General election

2010

General election

2006

Democratic primary

Republican primary

General election

2002

General election

References

03